Vigil is a 1984 New Zealand drama film directed by Vincent Ward and starring Penelope Stewart, Frank Whitten, Bill Kerr, Fiona Kay, and Gordon Shields. It was the first New Zealand film invited to play in the competitive section of the  Cannes Film Festival.

The film was nominated for awarded three awards at New Zealand's GOFTA Awards in 1986: Best Cinematography (Alun Bollinger), Best Original Screenplay (Vincent Ward), and Best Production Design (Kai Hawkins).

Plot
Eleven-year-old Toss lives on a remote farm in a valley somewhere deep in rural New Zealand with her father, mother and grandfather Birdie. When she witnesses her father's death while out herding sheep, she is shocked to see another man present, who then carries her father's body out of the bush. When the new man, Ethan moves onto the farm and begins a relationship with her mother, Toss sees him as an invader into her isolated world.

Cast
 Penelope Stewart as Elizabeth Peers
 Frank Whitten as Ethan Ruir
 Bill Kerr as Birdie
 Fiona Kay as Lisa "Toss" Peers
 Gordon Shields as Justin Peers

Production
Vincent Ward spent five years making Vigil, from pre-production to completion. Part of this was a lengthy pre-production process which involved him visiting hundreds of schools throughout New Zealand, looking for the right actor to play Toss. Similarly, Ward travelled all over New Zealand looking for a perfect setting before finding the isolated farm in Northern Taranaki where filming eventually took place.

Reception
Upon its release, Vigil polarised critics although generally it was reviewed positively. One particularly negative critic, Robert Brown of The Monthly Film Bulletin, criticised the film for its "irritating music-and-effects track" and said it offered "grand themes [...] but without any notion of how they connect in reality". Others however offered far more favourable reviews. The Los Angeles Times described Vigil as "a film of elemental beauty and growing tension". The Washington Post gave a positive review, saying "In Vigil, Ward gives us imagery that plays like blasted poetry", while The Guardian called it "a work of astonishing, original force [...] the most distinctive New Zealand film ever to reach Britain".

Notably, Vigil was the first New Zealand film to be selected for competition at the Cannes International Film Festival, where the film received a standing ovation.

References

External links

 Vigil at Vincent Ward Films
 Vigil on NZ On Screen

1984 films
1984 drama films
1984 directorial debut films
Films directed by Vincent Ward
Films set on farms
Films shot in New Zealand
New Zealand drama films
1980s New Zealand films
1980s English-language films